Emily Jane White is an American singer and songwriter from Oakland, California who has released six solo albums and toured internationally.

Early life
White was raised in Fort Bragg, California. White's father worked as a Merchant Marine out of the Port of Oakland, and her mother was a special education teacher for the Mendocino Unified School District.

White began to play music at age 5, but didn't enjoy the linear approach to piano lessons and preferred improvisation and playing by ear. At the age of 12 her father taught her chords on the guitar. At the age of 16 she wrote her first songs.

Education 
In 2003, White graduated with a degree in American Studies from UC–Santa Cruz. White's first musical explorations came as a member of punk and metal bands in college. She later branched off with her own group called Diamond Star Halos.

Career 
After college and spending time in Bordeaux, France, White moved to San Francisco to perform.

On November 2, 2007, White released her first album, Dark Undercoat, through Double Negative Records. It was released on Talitres in Europe and as a vinyl LP in 2008 by Saint Rose Records. It included the song "Wild Tigers I Have Known", the title track of the Cam Archer film of the same name. Archer would later direct a number of videos for the album. She later described the album as "really basic, it sounds like demos". For live performances, White was supported by Jen Grady and Carey Lamprecht on strings.

White's second album, entitled Victorian America, was released in October 2009 in Europe on Talitres, and on April 27, 2010, in the U.S. by Milan Records. It was recorded in San Francisco and Oakland. White had written a number of songs that she worked on with her band for "basically a year and a half before we went and recorded". Compared to her debut, she described it as "more of an ambitious record". The song "Liza" appeared on digital streaming platforms prior to the US release.

White's third album is entitled Ode to Sentience. The first single, "Requiem Waltz", first appeared on American Songwriter.

White appears on the song "Seeds" on Lonely Drifter Karen's 2010 album Fall of Spring.

In December 2013, White released Blood/Lines that included a contribution by Marissa Nadler. It was described as "a new stylistic development in her repertoire" and having a "neo-gothic feel".

In June 2016 the release of the new album was confirmed and preceded by the single "Frozen Garden". In July 2016, White released her fifth album They Moved in Shadow All Together that was described as "bringing her concern for race and gender equality to the fore of her poetic folk-pop". The album was recorded over a two-year period at the Tiny Telephone Studio in San Francisco.

Immanent Fire, White's sixth album, was released in November 2019 after being written over a period of two years. Major lyrical themes on the record include environmental collapse, capitalism and patriarchy. White co-produced the album with Anton Patzner, who also engineered and provided arrangements.

Style 
White explained her interest in "the shadow side of life" by stating that "you can unveil and sort of reveal…subtleties and nuances and undercurrents of things that are existing but no one wants to talk about". The song "The Black Dove" was inspired by the Black Lives Matter movement. White noted that "As a white person, there are so many misconceptions to what racism is, but the fact that you can turn a blind eye to issues of racial brutality is a symptom of being white". Her literary inspirations are often cited to be Cormac McCarthy, Emily Brontë, Edna St. Vincent Millay and Edgar Allan Poe.

Discography

Albums

Singles

References

External links

3 live videos at Intimepop.com
Second session live from intimepop.com at Intimepop.com

American folk singers
University of California, Santa Cruz alumni
Living people
Singer-songwriters from California
American women singer-songwriters
American alternative rock musicians
American women rock singers
Alternative rock singers
People from Fort Bragg, California
Year of birth missing (living people)
21st-century American women singers
21st-century American singers